Jimmy Roberts (born 1957) is a sportscaster for NBC Sports. Roberts joined NBC in May 2000 after serving as a sports reporter for almost 12 years at ESPN and ABC Sports where he won 11 Sports Emmy Awards.

Early life and career
Roberts grew up in White Plains, New York and graduated from White Plains High School in 1975. In high school, he played varsity lacrosse, was the school's morning announcer (originating the morning joke of the day) and occasionally wrote columns for his high-school newspaper, The Orange.

His journalism career began in 1975 when he started as a newspaper reporter. Roberts also worked under Howard Cosell as a writer and producer at ABC. His writing is regarded as some of the best in all of broadcast journalism.

He is a graduate of the University of Maryland, College Park. During his time at Maryland, Roberts worked at the popular campus hangout R.J. Bentley's Filling Station with one of his sports Emmys is on display there.

NBC Sports
Roberts is a host and interviewer for golf coverage on NBC and Golf Channel.

Other NBC assignments over the years for Roberts include hosting the halftime show for Notre Dame football, being one of the main anchors for NBC's weekend sports updates, anchoring the network's coverage of the French Open, and worked as a field reporter for NBC's coverage of the 2000 American League Championship Series. He has also reported on horse racing for NBC. Roberts has won two Emmys since joining NBC.

Roberts has covered 17 Olympic Games in his broadcasting career, including 9 with NBC Sports.

Other work
Roberts hosted and narrated the Outdoor Life Network's coverage of the 2005 Dakar Rally.

In April 2009, Roberts published his first book, Breaking the Slump (HarperCollins), which detailed the struggles of many famous golfers, including Jack Nicklaus, Arnold Palmer, George Herbert Walker Bush, and others and how they found their way through the inevitable challenges that plague anyone who plays the game.
Roberts also did field reporting for ABC's coverage of the Little League World Series.

Personal life
Roberts and his wife, Sandra Mayer, have three sons and they all live in Westchester County, New York.

Roberts' sister-in-law, Debbie Mayer, worked in the south tower on the 56th floor at New York City's World Trade Center. Immediately after American Airlines Flight 11 (the first aircraft of the September 11, 2001, attacks) struck the north tower, Mayer began going downstairs to leave the building. She had gotten to the 29th floor when the second aircraft struck, hitting the building she worked in. However, Mayer escaped safely before the towers collapsed.

Roberts told of the ordeal to USA Today:

We had a couple of very anxious hours. My wife couldn't get through to Debbie. Finally, she went to her Manhattan apartment to wait for her. And she found her there. Turns out when the first explosion occurred in Building 1, Debbie started down the stairs. She had made it to the 29th floor when the building was shaken when the second plane hit. She was terrified but made it out.

References

Living people
American television sports announcers
American television producers
Golf writers and broadcasters
Major League Baseball broadcasters
College football announcers
Notre Dame Fighting Irish football announcers
People associated with the September 11 attacks
Sports Emmy Award winners
Tennis commentators
University of Maryland, College Park alumni
Olympic Games broadcasters
1957 births
American horse racing announcers